Aleksandrovka (Emeri) is a rural locality (a selo) in Biryulinskoye Rural Settlement of Mayminsky District, the Altai Republic, Russia. The population was 314 as of 2016. There are 3 streets.

Geography 
Aleksandrovka is located in the valley of the Mayma River, 40 km south of Mayma (the district's administrative centre) by road. Sredny Saydys is the nearest rural locality.

References 

Rural localities in Mayminsky District